Caldwell Street Historic District is a national historic district located at Newberry, Newberry County, South Carolina.  The district encompasses 10 contributing buildings and 1 contributing site in Newberry.  The district includes eight upper class residences, two churches, and a cemetery.  The buildings reflect popular architectural styles from the late-19th and early-20th century including Victorian, Queen Anne, Tudor Revival, Gothic Revival, and Neoclassical.

It was listed on the National Register of Historic Places in 1980.

References

Historic districts on the National Register of Historic Places in South Carolina
Neoclassical architecture in South Carolina
Victorian architecture in South Carolina
Queen Anne architecture in South Carolina
Gothic Revival architecture in South Carolina
Tudor Revival architecture in South Carolina
Historic districts in Newberry County, South Carolina
National Register of Historic Places in Newberry County, South Carolina
Newberry, South Carolina